Gábor Takács (2 October 1959 – 4 May 2007) was a Hungarian sprint canoer who competed in the late 1980s. He won a silver medal in the C-4 1000 m event at the 1989 ICF Canoe Sprint World Championships in Plovdiv. Takács also finished seventh in the C-2 1000 m event at the 1988 Summer Olympics in Seoul.

References

Gábor Takács' profile at Sports Reference.com

1959 births
2007 deaths
Canoeists at the 1988 Summer Olympics
Hungarian male canoeists
Olympic canoeists of Hungary
ICF Canoe Sprint World Championships medalists in Canadian
20th-century Hungarian people